Buerstad is a village and statistical area (grunnkrets) in Nøtterøy municipality, Norway.

The statistical area Buerstad, which also can include the peripheral parts of the village as well as the surrounding countryside, has a population of 559.

The village Buerstad is located between Strengsdal in the west and Torød in the east. It is considered a part of the urban settlement Årøysund, which covers the southern part of the island. The urban settlement Årøysund has a population of 2,078.

References

Villages in Vestfold og Telemark